Tuneega Tuneega is a 2012 Indian Telugu-language romantic drama film written and directed by M. S. Raju. Starring Sumanth Ashwin and Rhea Chakraborty, the film is produced by Maganti Ramji under Padmini Arts banner. Distributed by Dil Raju under Sri Venkateswara Creations banner, the film was released worldwide on 20 July 2012.

Plot
Rama Swamy and Ravindra Babu are childhood friends who stay together. Their children Karthik and Nidhi are of the same age but they hate each other and torment each other by playing pranks. After a while, Nidhi is sent abroad for her further studies.

After a gap of twelve years, Nidhi comes back and meets Karthik at a family function. It's love at first sight for Karthik, but he hides his identity. Slowly Nidhi discovers the truth, and in the process, falls for Karthik’s charms. Just when everything seems rosy, Nidhi's family wants her to marry someone else. The rest of the story is about how Karthik wins his love.

Cast

 Sumanth Ashwin as Karthik
 Rhea Chakraborty as Nidhi
 Prabhu as Ramasamy
 Naga Babu as Ravindra Babu
 Manisha Yadav as Maithri
 Vasundhara Kashyap as Neethu
 Abinaya as Kavya
 Sayaji Shinde as James/Narrator
 Paruchuri Venkateswara Rao
 Vijayachander
 Seetha
 Vinod Kumar as Ravindra Babu's brother-in-law
 Chandra Mohan as priest
 Geetha
 Jyothi
 MS Narayana
 AVS
 Melkote as head Master
 Shriya Sharma as Young Nidhi
 Mrinal Dutt

Production
Sumanth Ashwin, son of director and producer M. S. Raju, is being introduced with the film. The title is inspired by the Telugu song 'Tunnega Tuneega' from the film Manasantha Nuvve, which was also produced by M. S. Raju. Reports of Sumanth's debut were afloat since 2007 in the media. M. S. Raju confirmed that he considered Sumanth for the lead role in Vaana. But M. S. Raju decided not to introduce him with Vaana as the character needed an experienced actor. In December 2007, Sumanth's debut film under the direction of Teja was announced. It was announced that the movie would be made under M. S. Raju's banner Sumanth Art Productions. It was launched on 14 December 2007. Due to undisclosed reasons, it never went onto sets and the film was shelved. In April 2010, it was reported that V. N. Aditya was directing Sumanth's debut film under their home banner. In May 2010, it was announced that the film was titled Mirchi with Maganti Ramji producing and Aditya directing.

In January 2011, it was announced that V. N. Aditya was no longer part of the project and M. S. Raju would direct. In March 2012, it was announced that the filming had been completed and the film was titled Tunnega Tuneega. It was also announced that Dil Raju's Sri Venkateswara Creations will present and distribute the film. In April 2012, the first look was released, and it was revealed that former MTV VJ Rhea Chakraborty is paired alongside Sumanth. It was censored on 16 July and received a U certificate without any cuts.

Critical reception
The Times of India rated the film two-and-a-half stars out of five, and stated that "The film just doesn't come together visually. It lacks the freshness and feel of a new film. The lack of novelty across the board proves to be its undoing." Vishnupriya Bhandaram of The Hindu wrote that "Good stories are easy to understand but in Tuneega Tuneega, confusion reigns over the story and the screenplay and a lack of connect with the characters would perhaps be the most natural of reactions."

Soundtrack

The soundtrack was composed by Karthik Raja, his first Telugu film. The album consists of eight songs: four were penned by Krishna Chaitanya and three by Sirivennela Sitaramasastri. The soundtrack album was released on 10 June 2012 at Lalitha Kala Thoranam in Hyderabad. It was released through Aditya Music label.

Awards

CineMAA Awards
 CineMAA Awards Best Male Debut (2013): Sumanth Ashwin

References

External links

2012 films
2010s Telugu-language films
Indian romantic drama films
2012 romantic drama films
Films scored by Karthik Raja
Films directed by M. S. Raju